Antonio Bonfatti (born December 1, 1950) is an Argentine physician and politician from the Socialist Party, who was Governor of Santa Fe. From 2016 to 2021, he was president of the Socialist Party.

Life and times
Bonfatti was born in Rosario in 1950. He enrolled at the National University of Rosario and was accepted into the School of Medicine. There, he developed an interest in politics, and in 1972, co-founded the Popular Socialist Party with activists Guillermo Estévez Boero and Hermes Binner. He earned a Medical Degree in 1974, and for the next two years, worked with Binner in a slum clinic outside Rosario.

The March 1976 coup prompted him to relocate to Las Parejas, a small town west of Rosario. He would remain in Las Parejas, working as a physician in a provincial SAMCo clinic and for the Steelworkers' Union in the field of occupational medicine. Upon the return of democracy in 1983, he was elected Mayor. Bonfatti's term expired in 1989, at which time he was elected to the City Council for a four-year term. He maintained his medical practice during his tenure as mayor and councilman, and in 1993 earned a postgraduate degree in healthcare administration.

The election of Hermes Binner as Mayor of Rosario in 1995 was followed by Bonfatti's appointment as Municipal Secretary of Public Health. He was named Secretary of Government by Mayor Binner in 1997 and remained in the post until the end of Binner's term in 2003, when Bonfatti was elected to the Provincial Legislature. His entry into the legislature coincided with Binner's election as governor, and the Socialist Party caucus elected Bonfatti as its leader.

Governor Binner, who was re-elected in 2007, appointed Bonfatti Minister of Government and State Reform. Bonfatti streamlined the bureaucratic and electoral process in the province during his tenure, and was endorsed by Binner as candidate for governor in 2011 on the Progressive, Civic, and Social Front, whose nomination he sought without opposition. He was elected governor on July 24 with nearly 40% of the vote; followed by Republican Proposal candidate, actor Miguel del Sel, with 36%; and Congressman Agustín Rossi of the FpV, with 23%.

External links
Gobierno de Santa Fe
Antonio Bonfatti. Gobernador

References

1950 births
Living people
People from Rosario, Santa Fe
Argentine people of Italian descent
National University of Rosario alumni
Argentine physicians
Mayors of Rosario, Santa Fe
Governors of Santa Fe Province
Socialist Party (Argentina) politicians